The banded ground gecko (Goniurosaurus splendens)  is a gecko. It is endemic to Tokunoshima in the Ryukyu Islands of Japan.<

References

Goniurosaurus
Endemic reptiles of Japan
Endemic fauna of the Ryukyu Islands
Reptiles described in 1959